Pyakuto is a freshwater lake in Yamalo-Nenets Autonomous Okrug, Russia. The name of the lake originated in the Forest Nenets language.

The lake lies below the Arctic circle in an area of permafrost. Its shores are low and swampy. There is a winter road passing across the lake.

Geography
Pyakuto is a lake of thermokarst origin having a roughly round shape with a deep indentation in the western shore. The lake is located in the Purovsky District, at the southern end of the Yamalo-Nenets Autonomous Okrug,  to the southwest of Muravlenko.

Flora and fauna
On the eastern shore there is tundra moss vegetation and on the northern coniferous forest. Among the fish species found in the lake, peled and humpback whitefish deserve mention.

See also
List of lakes of Russia

References

External links
Lake Pyakuto, Holmogorskij - Russia Tourist Attractions

Lakes of Yamalo-Nenets Autonomous Okrug
Pur basin